Buciclic acid, or bucyclic acid, systematic name trans-4-butylcyclohexane-1-carboxylic acid, is a simple alkyl-substituted cyclohexanecarboxylic acid. The salts and esters of buciclic acid are known as buciclates (bucyclates). Pharmaceutical examples of esters of this acid include testosterone buciclate, a long-acting prodrug of the androgen testosterone, and dimethandrolone buciclate, a prodrug of dimethandrolone.

See also
 Ciclotic acid

References

Cyclohexanecarboxylic acids